Saka Parish is an administrative unit of South Kurzeme Municipality in the Courland region of Latvia. The parish has a population of 626 (as of 1/07/2010) and covers an area of 318.292 km2.

Villages of Saka parish 
 Mežvidi
 Orgsaļiena
 Pievikas (Rīva)
 Saka
 Saliena
 Strante
 Ulmale
 Upsēde

Parishes of Latvia
South Kurzeme Municipality
Courland